The 1937 Santa Barbara State Gauchos football team represented Santa Barbara State during the 1937 college football season.

Santa Barbara State competed in the Southern California Intercollegiate Athletic Conference (SCIAC). The Gauchos were led by fourth-year head coach Theodore "Spud" Harder and played home games at Peabody Stadium in Santa Barbara, California. They finished the season with a record of five wins, two losses and two ties (5–2–2, 3–1–1 SCIAC). Overall, the team outscored its opponents 138–49 for the season.

Schedule

Team players in the NFL
No Santa Barbara Gaucho players were selected in the 1938 NFL Draft.

The following finished their Santa Barbara career in 1937, were not drafted, but played in the NFL.

Notes

References

Santa Barbara State
UC Santa Barbara Gauchos football seasons
Santa Barbara State Gauchos football